Black Site or blacksite or variations may refer to:

 Black site, a secret military or prison site
 CIA black sites, black sites run by the CIA during the war on terror
 BlackSite: Area 51, a video game released in 2007
 Big Black Site, Eagle Lake, Maine, listed on the U.S. National Register of Historic Places (NRHP) in Maine
 Black Site (Greenwood, Mississippi), listed on the NRHP in Mississippi
 Black Site (Sidon, Mississippi), listed on the NRHP in Mississippi
 Black Site, a film directed by Sophia Banks
 "Black Site" (Voltron: Legendary Defender)